Ahmed Marei (born 14 January 1987) is a retired Jordanian footballer who played as a forward.

Honours
 Jordan Premier League top scorer: 2009–10 (14 goals)

References

External links
 
 jo.gitsport.net

Living people
Jordanian footballers
Jordan international footballers
Al-Hussein SC (Irbid) players
That Ras Club players
Al-Asalah players
1987 births
Association football forwards
Al-Jalil players
Shabab Al-Ordon Club players
Al-Sheikh Hussein FC players
Jordanian Pro League players